Wila railway station is a railway station in the Swiss canton of Zürich and municipality of Wila. The station is located on the Tösstal railway line and is served by Zürich S-Bahn lines S11 and S26.

References

External links
 
 Wila station on Swiss Federal Railway's web site

Railway stations in the canton of Zürich
Swiss Federal Railways stations